July 20 - Eastern Orthodox Church calendar - July 22

All fixed commemorations below are celebrated on August 3 by Old Calendar.

For July 21st, Orthodox Churches on the Old Calendar commemorate the Saints listed on July 8.

Saints
 Prophet Ezekiel (6th century BC)  (see also: July 23)
 Hieromartyr Zoticus, Bishop of Comana in Armenia (204)
 Martyrs Theophilus, Trophimus and another 13 martyrs with them (305)  (see also: July 23)
 Martyrs Justus and Matthew, and Eugene, at Rome (305)
 Martyrs Theodore and George.
 Holy 3 Martyrs of Melitene, dragged to death.
 Hieromartyr Bargabdesian, Deacon, at Arbela in Assyria (354)
 Saints Paul, Bishop, and John, Priest, ascetics, near Edessa (5th century)
 Venerable Symeon of Emesa, Fool-for-Christ (590), and his fellow ascetic St. John (c. 590)  (see also: July 23)

Pre-Schism Western saints
 Saint Praxedes, the daughter of the Roman senator Pudens and sister of St Pudentiana (2nd century)
 Saint Julia of Troyes (c. 272)
 Saints Claudius, Justus, Jucundinus and Companions, a group of eight martyrs, who suffered with St Julia in Troyes in France under Aurelian (273)
 Martyr Victor of Marseilles, and soldiers Alexander, Felician and Longinus (c. 290)
 Saint Constantine, a disciple and the first successor of St Benedict at Monte Cassino in Italy (c. 560)
 Saint Arbogast,  7th-century missionary to the Frankish Empire and an early Bishop of Strasbourg (c. 678)
 Saints John and Benignus, twin brothers and monks at Moyenmoutier in France (707)
 Saint Wastrada, the mother of St Gregory of Utrecht, she became a nun at the end of her life (c. 760)

Post-Schism Orthodox saints
 Venerable Onuphrius the Silent, of the Kiev Caves (12th century)
 Venerable Onesimus the Hermit, recluse of the Kiev Caves Monastery (12th-13th century)
 Venerable Manuel II Palaiologos (Matthew in monasticism) (1425)
 Venerable Raphael (1640-1645) and Parthenius (1660) of Old Agapia Monastery, Romania.
 Saint Parthenius of Radobysdio, Arta, Bishop (1777)
 Ethno-Hieromartyr Meletios (Kyriakos), Bishop of Kitros (1821)

New martyrs and confessors
 New Hieromartyr Peter Golubev, Priest (1938)
 New Hieromartyrs Simo Banjac and Milan Stojisavljevic, and the latter’s son Martyr Milan of Glamoc, Serbia (1941-1945)

Other commemorations
 Synaxis of Icon of the Most Holy Theotokos of "Armatia", Constantinople.  (see also: August 17)
 Synaxis of Saint Eleutherius, Bishop of Illyricum, in the Church by "Dry Hill".
 Synaxis of the holy martyr Acacius of Cappadocia, in Heptascalon.  (see also: May 7)
 Uncovering of the relics (1649) of St. Anna of Kashin, Princess of Kashin (Euphrosyne in monasticism) (1337)
 Uncovering of the relics (1999) of New Hiero-confessor Roman Medved of Moscow, Archpriest (1937)  (see also: August 26)
 Repose of Abbess Arsenia (Sebryakova) of the Ust-Medveditsk Convent (ru) (1905) 
 Repose of Abbot Gerasim of the Chudov Monastery (1911)
 Repose of Blessed Anthony Petrovich Shuvalov, wonderworker of Undor-Simbirsk (1942)
 Repose of Abbess Euphemia of the Ravanica and St. Petka monasteries, Serbia (1958)

Icon gallery

Notes

References

Sources
 July 21/August 3. Orthodox Calendar (PRAVOSLAVIE.RU).
 August 3 / July 21. HOLY TRINITY RUSSIAN ORTHODOX CHURCH (A parish of the Patriarchate of Moscow).
 July 21. OCA - The Lives of the Saints.
 July 21. The Year of Our Salvation - Holy Transfiguration Monastery, Brookline, Massachusetts. 
 The Autonomous Orthodox Metropolia of Western Europe and the Americas (ROCOR). St. Hilarion Calendar of Saints for the year of our Lord 2004. St. Hilarion Press (Austin, TX). p. 54.
 The Twenty-First Day of the Month of July. Orthodoxy in China.
 July 21. Latin Saints of the Orthodox Patriarchate of Rome.
 The Roman Martyrology. Transl. by the Archbishop of Baltimore. Last Edition, According to the Copy Printed at Rome in 1914. Revised Edition, with the Imprimatur of His Eminence Cardinal Gibbons. Baltimore: John Murphy Company, 1916. pp. 215–216.
 Rev. Richard Stanton. A Menology of England and Wales, or, Brief Memorials of the Ancient British and English Saints Arranged According to the Calendar, Together with the Martyrs of the 16th and 17th Centuries. London: Burns & Oates, 1892. pp. 349–351.

 Greek Sources
 Great Synaxaristes:  21 ΙΟΥΛΙΟΥ. ΜΕΓΑΣ ΣΥΝΑΞΑΡΙΣΤΗΣ.
  Συναξαριστής. 21 Ιουλίου. ECCLESIA.GR. (H ΕΚΚΛΗΣΙΑ ΤΗΣ ΕΛΛΑΔΟΣ). 
  21/07/. Ορθόδοξος Συναξαριστής.

 Russian Sources
  3 августа (21 июля). Православная Энциклопедия под редакцией Патриарха Московского и всея Руси Кирилла (электронная версия). (Orthodox Encyclopedia - Pravenc.ru).
  21 июля по старому стилю / 3 августа по новому стилю. СПЖ "Союз православных журналистов". .
  21 июля (ст.ст.) 3 августа  (нов. ст.). Русская Православная Церковь Отдел внешних церковных связей. (DECR).

July in the Eastern Orthodox calendar